Flashback with the Grateful Dead is an album by the rock band the Grateful Dead.  It contains ten songs, selected from eight of their studio albums that were originally released between 1969 and 1989.  The compilation was released on CD on the Flashback label, a subsidiary of Rhino Records, on April 5, 2011.

Critical reception

On Allmusic, Steve Leggett said, "This ten-song budget compilation can hardly begin to catch the whole ragged familial appeal of the Dead, but it does, given its brevity, provide snapshots of the band at different points in time, which makes it a pretty nice and low-priced purchase for the absolute novice fan.  Deadheads will already have every song here ten times over and in countless versions."

Track listing

Personnel
Grateful Dead
Jerry Garcia – guitar, vocals
Bob Weir – guitar, vocals
Phil Lesh – bass, vocals
Bill Kreutzmann – drums
Mickey Hart – drums on "Truckin'", "China Cat Sunflower", "The Music Never Stopped", "Shakedown Street", "Alabama Getaway", "Throwing Stones", "Standing on the Moon", "Touch of Grey"
Ron "Pigpen" McKernan – keyboards, percussion on "Truckin'", "China Cat Sunflower"
Tom Constanten – keyboards on "China Cat Sunflower"
Keith Godchaux – keyboards on "Unbroken Chain", "U.S. Blues", "The Music Never Stopped", "Shakedown Street"
Donna Jean Godchaux – vocals on "Unbroken Chain", "U.S. Blues", "The Music Never Stopped", "Shakedown Street"
Brent Mydland – keyboards, vocals on "Alabama Getaway", "Throwing Stones", "Standing on the Moon", "Touch of Grey"
Additional musicians
Howard Wales – organ on "Truckin'"

References

Grateful Dead compilation albums
2011 compilation albums